Liloan is the name of two places in the Philippines:

Liloan, Cebu
Liloan, Southern Leyte